Muhammad Afzal (born 1 September 1967) is a Pakistani sprinter. He competed in the men's 100 metres at the 1988 Summer Olympics.

References

External links
 

1967 births
Living people
Athletes (track and field) at the 1988 Summer Olympics
Pakistani male sprinters
Olympic athletes of Pakistan
Place of birth missing (living people)